Never Mind the Buzzcocks is a British comedy panel television programme broadcast on BBC Two in 1996–2015, and revived on Sky Max in 2021. Its presenter has the role of introducing the show, explaining the rules to each round, using their discretion to award points and providing information where required. They also provided comedy with jokes, satire and visual gags. 63  people (including the regulars) presented, or co-presented, at least one regular episode of Never Mind the Buzzcocks.

Buzzcocks was originally presented by English comedian, radio DJ and television presenter Mark Lamarr between 1996 and 2005. After 17 series Lamarr decided to have a break from the show, and did not return. For the 18th series, similarly to Have I Got News for You, each episode was presented by a different guest each week. After one series of guests, comedian and presenter Simon Amstell was announced as the next permanent presenter in 2006, he had presented the second episode of series 18 and had also appeared on the show as a guest twice: the eighth episode of series 13 and the eleventh of series 16. He remained in the role for four series up to 2008 leaving to focus on his live stand-up. Upon Amstell's departure the show once again used guest presenters from the 23rd series to the 27th. In July 2014 it was announced that the third permanent host will be Welsh comedian Rhod Gilbert. Gilbert had previously presented the second episode of series 23 and the eleventh of series 25, he also appeared as a guest once on the fourth episode of series 18. The show was cancelled in 2015, after Gilbert had presented one series. It returned on Sky Max in 2021 for a 29th series, hosted by Greg Davies.

Regular presenters
The following is a list of the regular presenters in the order they first appeared. The periods when guest presenters were used are also included for a comprehensive timeline.

Guest presenters
The following is a list of the guest presenters in the order they first appeared.

 – indicates this person has not hosted a regular episode
(#) – indicates the number of episodes presented if highlights and specials are included

See also
List of television presenters
List of Never Mind the Buzzcocks episodes

References

External links
Never Mind the Buzzcocks
 (includes full list of presenters)

Lists of television presenters
Lists of celebrities
British television-related lists
Presenters